Not a Love Story: A Film About Pornography is a Canadian documentary film about the pornography industry, directed by Bonnie Sherr Klein and released in 1981.

It remains one of the landmark works from Studio D, the women's unit of the National Film Board of Canada. The film was banned in the province of Ontario on the basis of its pornographic content, a decision that was later reversed.

The film premiered at the 1981 Festival of Festivals.

Synopsis
Film-maker Bonnie Sherr Klein and stripper (later journalist) Lindalee Tracy explore the world of pornography and build a case against it. They interview porn actors, sex workers and notable feminists such as Margaret Atwood and Kate Millett.

Participants
 Margaret Atwood
 Kathleen Barry
 Edward Donnerstein
 Susan Griffin
 Bonnie Sherr Klein
 Kate Millett
 Robin Morgan
 Kenneth Pitchford
 Suze Randall
 Marc Stevens
 Lindalee Tracey

Production
The film had a budget of $503,519.

Release
The film was banned in Saskatchewan. The Ontario Censor Board refused to classify it, resulting it not being allowed to be shown, but the film was seen by 40,000 people at 300 private showings in Ontario within the next year. The film became the NFB's highest-grossing film at that point in its existence after being shown in Montreal for nine months.

Critical response
At the time, the local Canadian reviewers were hostile. The Globe and Mail called the film "bourgeois feminist fascism" and the Toronto Star judged it to be "a one-sided tract of outrage that only feminists and moral majority believers will take to their bosom". Writing in the Village Voice, B. Ruby Rich dismissed the film as anti-porn propaganda. Jay Scott criticized the film as an "unenlightening learn-a-long."

Later reviewers and analysts have criticized the film for relying upon graphic sexual imagery, for focusing upon sex work rather than the porn industry and for not differentiating between straight and gay porn.

References

Works cited

Further reading

External links
 Not a Love Story: A Film About Pornography (National Film Board of Canada)
 
 

Anti-pornography feminism
Canadian documentary films
Documentary films about feminism
Documentary films about pornography
National Film Board of Canada documentaries
Films directed by Bonnie Sherr Klein
1981 documentary films
1981 films
1980s English-language films
1980s Canadian films